Leonard Roth (29 August 1904 Edmonton, London, England – 28 November 1968 Pittsburgh, Pennsylvania) was a mathematician working in the Italian school of algebraic geometry. He introduced an example of a unirational variety that was not rational (though his proof that it was not rational was incomplete).

Roth was educated at Latymer Upper School, Dulwich College and Clare College, Cambridge, where he graduated as a Wrangler in 1926. His sister was Queenie Roth, literary critic and wife of F. R. Leavis.

Publications

References

Further reading

20th-century English mathematicians
1904 births
1968 deaths
Alumni of Clare College, Cambridge
British Jews
People from Edmonton, London
British emigrants to the United States